The 2007 SBets.net Las Vegas Desert Classic (also billed as Las Vegas Desert Classic VI) was the sixth time that the Professional Darts Corporation stage the prestigious darts tournament. The tournament was held at the Mandalay Bay Resort and Casino for the second successive year and was staged between July 3 and July 8, televised on Sky Sports from July 4 - there was no title sponsor for the event after PartyPoker.net's sponsorship lasted for just one year. 

The opening day of the tournament saw a few surprise results - none more so than when Mark Dudbridge stunned three-time Desert Classic champion Phil Taylor 6-5.

Raymond van Barneveld secured his third major PDC title of the year adding to his World Championship and UK Open successes by beating Terry Jenkins in the final.

Prize money
The prize fund increases for the 2007 event to a total of £126,400.
Champion £20,000 
Runner-up £10,066 
Semi-finalists £7,000 
Quarter-finalists £5,000  
Second round Losers £3,000 
First round Losers £2,000 
Qualifying event prize fund £6,400.

Results
A random draw was held after each round meaning no seedings were applied.

Television coverage
Sky Sports broadcast the event live in the UK & Ireland for the 6th year running. The final between van Barneveld & Jenkins achieved viewing figures of 82,000 - although that was surpassed by other matches during the week.  
Wednesday 120,000 (SS1) & 65,000 (SS2)
Thursday 90,000 (SS1) & 115,000 (SS2)
Friday unavailable
Saturday 87,000 (SS2)
Sunday 82,000 (SS1)

Qualification
Following the 2007 UK Open at the beginning of June, top 12 players of the PDC Order of Merit became the automatic qualifiers for the sixth Desert Classic. They are Phil Taylor, Raymond van Barneveld, Colin Lloyd, Peter Manley, Terry Jenkins, Dennis Priestley, Adrian Lewis, Wayne Mardle, Roland Scholten, Andy Hamilton, James Wade and defending champion John Part. 

Four North American's qualified for the event via qualification tournaments across the United States and Canada. They were Darin Young, John Kuczynski, Gary Mawson and Gerry Convery. 

16 further places were to be decided at two qualification days on the eve of the tournament itself. These qualifying events were for lower ranked PDPA members and US residents. Eight players each day joined the automatic qualifiers in the first round of the main event.

Monday's qualifiers were Wes Newton, Steve Maish, Kevin Painter, Steve Beaton, Colin Osborne, Mervyn King, Ray Carver and Dennis Smith. Tuesday's qualifiers were Alan Tabern, Mark Dudbridge, John Ferrell, Tony Eccles, Stuart Holden, Andy Smith, Steve Smith, Vincent van der Voort.

Players Championship
On the eve of the Las Vegas Desert Classic a PDPA Players Championship event was held on Sunday July 1 and was won by Raymond van Barneveld.

References

External links
 Pictures from the 2007 Las Vegas Desert Classic
Tournament information and registration form
Results and reports Planetdarts web site

Las Vegas Desert Classic
Las Vegas Desert Classic